Bucko may refer to: 

 Bucko (comics), a webcomic by Jeff Parker and Erika Moen
 Bucko Lake Mine, a nickel mine near Wabowden, Manitoba, Canada

People
 Bucko Kilroy (1921–2007), football player and executive
 Ema Burgić Bucko (born 1992), Bosnian tennis player
 Ivan Bucko (1891–1974), Ukrainian Greek Catholic archbishop
 Karol Bučko, former Slovak football coach
 Michal Piter-Bučko (born 1985), Slovak footballer
 Raymond A. Bucko, Jesuit priest and anthropologist
 Wilfred McDonald (known as Bucko; 1911–1991), Canadian professional hockey and lacrosse player, coach, and politician
 Wes Trainor (known as Bucko; 1922–1991), ice hockey player

See also
 Bucco (disambiguation)
 Buck (disambiguation)
 Buckow, a town in Märkisch-Oderland, Brandenburg, Germany